Bärbel Röhl (born 6 March 1950) is a German actress.

Life and career
Little is known about Bärbel Röhl regarding verifiable biographical data. Accordingly, she was born on 6 March 1950 in Kargow, Mecklenburg-Vorpommern in what was then East Germany. From 1968 to 1972, she completed an apprenticeship as a graduate actress at the Theaterhochschule Leipzig. Since 1979, Röhl has worked at various German theaters and has also been in front of the camera for film and television productions since 1983. In 1998, she also obtained another professional qualification as a naturopath. According to her vita, she has completed a vocal training (classical and musical), performs with literary-musical programs and lives in Berlin.

Personal life
Röhl is the mother of Katja Frenzel and Anna Frenzel-Röhl and the aunt of Henriette Richter-Röhl, all in whom are also actresses.

References

External links 
 Official Website
 

1950 births
Living people
People from Mecklenburgische Seenplatte (district)
German film actresses
German stage actresses
German television actresses
20th-century German actresses
21st-century German actresses